The Rogätz Ferry, also known as the Schartau Rogätz Ferry, is a ferry across the Elbe river between Schartau and Rogätz in Saxony-Anhalt, Germany.

References 

Ferries across Elbe
Ferry transport in Saxony-Anhalt